Olly Woodrow Wilson, Jr. (September 7, 1937 – March 12, 2018) was an American composer of contemporary classical music, pianist, double bassist, and a musicologist. He was one of the most preeminent composers of African American descent in the twentieth and twenty-first centuries. He is known for developing a list of Heterogenous Sound Ideals that is widely used to dissect different aspects of music, with an emphasis on African culture. According to Wilson himself, "The essence of Africanness consists of a way of doing something, not simply something that is done" (1991). This motto is the basis of Wilson's work in the realm of ethnomusicology. He is also known for establishing the TIMARA (Technology in Music and Related Arts) program at Oberlin Conservatory, the first-ever conservatory program in electronic music. Olly's richly varied musical background included not only  traditional compositions and academic disciplines, but also his professional experience as a jazz and orchestral musician, work in electronic media, and studies of African music in West Africa itself.

Biography
Wilson was born in St. Louis, Missouri, to Alma Grace Peoples Wilson, a seamstress, and Olly Woodrow Wilson, Sr., an insurance salesman and butler. He graduated with a B.M. degree from Washington University in St. Louis in 1959, and earned an M.M. degree in music composition in 1960 from the University of Illinois. His composition instructors included Robert Wykes, Robert Kelley, and Philip Bezanson. He earned a Ph.D. from the University of Iowa in 1964.

Wilson taught at Florida Agricultural and Mechanical University and the Oberlin Conservatory of Music (1965-1970). He was an emeritus professor of music at the University of California, Berkeley, where he taught from 1970 to 2002 when he retired. He also served as the chairman of that university's music department between 1993 and 1997. His notable students include Neil Rolnick, Dwight Banks, Robert Greenberg, Tony Williams (jazz drummer) and Frank La Rocca.

He was commissioned by the Chicago Symphony Orchestra, the Boston Symphony and New York Philharmonic. He was commissioned by the 1979 International Contemporary Organ Music Festival at the Hartt School of Music for his organ work Expansions, which was premiered at the festival by Donald Sutherland.

Wilson's music is published by Gunmar Music (a division of G. Schirmer). His music has been recorded on the Columbia, CRI, Desto, Turnabout, and New World labels.

Wilson died March 12, 2018, in Berkeley, California at the age of 80.

Heterogeneous sound ideals 
Olly Wilson contributed to the study of African and American music by defining heterogeneous sound ideals that involve common themes in traditional African music: such as use of aspects of sound (pitch, duration, timbre and volume), usage of physical body movement in music making, and introspection of listeners.  His heterogenous sound ideals are still used today to help identify different aspects of sounds in various types of music.

These ideas include: 

1.) Rhythmic/metrical contrast or clash (includes significant use of syncopation, unusual metric changes, contrast between two different parts/voices, etc.). 

2.) Singing and/or playing in a percussive manner (qualitative accents or stress within the melody). 

3.) various forms of a call & response (within a single melody/rhythm or between two parts). Call and response can be separate articulations (simple alternation) or may overlap (similar to a round: "Row, row, row your boat"). 

4.)High density of musical events within a short time frame with a tendency to fill up the aural space (e.g., lots of layers or parts in 2-bar phrase or loop a few parts that fill up the aural space through contrasting timbres, using a lot of linear and or horizontal space, etc.).

5.) Tendency to incorporate physical body motion as integral part of music making process. 

6.) Broad continuum of vocal sounds and expression as melody, from speech to song. Thought to be a retention of African drumming which approximated speech through rhythm and tonal levels: high-mid-low. Consider style of certain black preaching, praying, rapping, and singing all part of same continuum.  

7.) The use of a wide range of timbres to help define the levels of the musical structure (Bass vs. treble is one example. Each has a specific  pitch and timbre that has a specific rhythmic role). 

8.) Kaleidoscopic range of dramatically contrasting timbres (qualities or colors of sounds) within a single melodic lone or among several interlocking melodic lines (voices, instruments, and/or sounds). Often non-lexical vocal expression (moans, hollers) or instruments are used to stimulate vocal speech without words, through tonal inflection or linguistic sensitivity sound (i.e., making a guitar or turntable "talk" or "speak"). 

9.) Fixed melo-rhythmic idea or group vs. Variable melo-rhythmic idea or group. At least two different levels of rhythm results, each enhancing or functioning in relation to the other. One usually serves as "time-line". A time line need not be an evenly-pulsed beat like counting the beats in meter. Could be more complex rhythm that rarely if ever changes (snare could be seen as timeline. Often in African music a high bell served as timeline). 

10.) The audience (dancers, interjections from audience) all highlight the experience of black music-making. Individually can be expressed within collectivity.

Awards and honors
Elected to The American Academy of Arts and Letters, 1995
Received a Guggenheim Fellowship in 1971, which he used to live in West Africa, where he studied African music and languages.
Received a Rome Prize, 2008

Bibliography

References

External links

Olly Wilson biography at the Music Sales Group
Olly Wilson interview, February 4, 1991

1937 births
2018 deaths
20th-century classical composers
African-American classical composers
American classical composers
African-American male classical composers
University of Iowa alumni
American classical double-bassists
Male double-bassists
American classical pianists
American male classical pianists
Oberlin College faculty
University of California, Berkeley faculty
Musicians from Berkeley, California
Florida A&M University faculty
Washington University in St. Louis alumni
Musicians from St. Louis
Members of the American Academy of Arts and Letters
Musicians from the San Francisco Bay Area
American contemporary classical composers
American male classical composers
Experimental Music Studios alumni
20th-century American composers
20th-century American pianists
African-American classical pianists
20th-century American male musicians